George Horbury (born 23 June 2004) is a professional footballer who plays as a central midfielder for Marske United, on loan from League Two club Harrogate Town.

Playing career
On 27 June 2022, after a successful season as a youth team scholar, Horbury signed a professional contract with his hometown club Harrogate Town. Upon doing so, he became the first Harrogate academy player to sign a professional deal with the club in what was their maiden season in the Football League Youth Alliance.

On 27 August 2022, Horbury made his first appearance for the club coming on as a late substitute in a defeat to Newport County.

On 21 January 2023, it was announced George had joined Northern Premier League Premier Division side Marske United on a one-month loan deal. He scored on his debut in a 2-1 win over Ashton United. After impressing with Marske, his loan deal was extended until the end of the 2022–23 season.

References

External links

Living people
English footballers
Association football midfielders
Sportspeople from Harrogate
Harrogate Town A.F.C. players
Marske United F.C. players
English Football League players
2004 births